The Human Animal may refer to:
 The Human Animal (book), a 1955 book by Weston La Barre
 The Human Animal (TV series), a 1994 BBC nature documentary series and accompanying book

See also 
 Human Animal, a 2006 album by Wolf Eyes